The Touring Car Masters is an Australian motor racing series open to modified touring cars manufactured between 1 January 1963 and 31 December 1978. It evolved out of a previous series for CAMS Group N Touring Cars but with a greater degree of modifications permitted to improve safety, reliability and affordability. These improvements would have been against the Group N regulations which are focused on vehicles racing as much as possible as they did in the period when the cars were new.

The series has proved popular with fans for the nostalgia value and also for the mix of eligible vehicles with the majority of competing vehicles being Australian or American V8s. Each model is allocated into one of four classes by the appointed category managers, Touring Car Masters Pty. Ltd, with drivers competing for Series Class awards based on finishing positions within each Class at each race. Performance parity is maintained between disparate models by varying maximum engine revolutions and minimum racing weights of those vehicles. In addition, a driver may be classified as a seeded driver and additional parity adjustments applied to cars driven by these drivers, as deemed appropriate.

Class winners

References

External links
 

 
Touring car racing series
Motorsport categories in Australia
Auto racing series in Australia